Eulalia Martínez (born 22 April 1939) is a Mexican former swimmer. She competed in two events at the 1960 Summer Olympics.

References

External links
 

1939 births
Living people
Mexican female swimmers
Olympic swimmers of Mexico
Swimmers at the 1960 Summer Olympics
Swimmers from Mexico City
Pan American Games medalists in swimming
Pan American Games bronze medalists for Mexico
Swimmers at the 1959 Pan American Games
Central American and Caribbean Games gold medalists for Mexico
Central American and Caribbean Games medalists in swimming
Competitors at the 1959 Central American and Caribbean Games
Female butterfly swimmers
Medalists at the 1959 Pan American Games
20th-century Mexican women
21st-century Mexican women